Thomas Hopper (1776–1856) was an English architect of the late 18th and early 19th centuries, much favoured by King George IV, and particularly notable for his work on country houses across southern England, with occasional forays further afield, into Wales and Ireland (especially Ulster).

He was involved with improvements to the Shire Hall in Monmouth under "Royal assent", where he and Edward Haycock made the building extend down Agincourt Street, creating room for a new staircase and larger courts. Hopper took up residence in Monnow Street in Monmouth whilst this was in progress.

In 1840 he exhibited designs for Butterton Hall in Staffordshire. This gothic building lasted until the First World War when it was demolished due to misuse.

Hopper died in 1856.

Projects
Leigh Court, North Somerset (1814)
Penrhyn Castle, Llandegai, Bangor, North Wales (1822–1837)
Kentwell Hall, Suffolk (1820s)
Arthur’s Club, 69–70 St James’s Street, London (after 1940 the Carlton) (1826–7)
Llanover Hall, Abergavenny, Wales (1827–1837; demolished 1935)
Improvements to the Shire Hall, Monmouth (1829) 
Bryn Bras Castle, Llanrug, North Wales (1829–1835)
Margam Castle, South Wales (1830–1840)
Wivenhoe House, Essex (1846–53)
Hospital buildings at St Mary's Hospital, Paddington, London (1851)
Alscot Park, Warwickshire
Amesbury Abbey, Wiltshire (1834–1840 and 1859–1860): a country house named for the nearby former abbey; Grade I listed
Boreham House, Essex
Gothic Conservatory at Carlton House, London, demolished
Crichel House, Dorset, alterations
Danbury Place, Essex
Easton Lodge, Essex
Englefield House, Berkshire
Gosford Castle, County Armagh
Chapel at Stansted Park, West Sussex
Glemham House, Great Glenham, Suffolk (1814)
Terling Place, Essex (1818–1824): alterations
Works at Windsor Castle
Gothic Ballroom at Slane Castle, County Meath, Ireland
Entrance lodge at Dromoland Castle, County Clare, Ireland
Woolverstone Hall, Suffolk (extension and remodelling)
Rood Ashton House, Wiltshire (extension and remodelling)

Gallery of architectural works

References

19th-century English architects
1776 births
1856 deaths